John Tracy is a fictional character from Gerry Anderson's Supermarionation television series Thunderbirds and the subsequent films Thunderbirds Are Go, Thunderbird 6 and the live-action film Thunderbirds.

Thunderbirds (1965-66)

Background
John was originally intended to play a larger role in Thunderbirds, but after creator Gerry Anderson took a dislike to the character he ended up appearing less often than planned. He was the first of the Tracy brothers to be voice-cast. Actor Ray Barrett was so impressed with the marionette, whose face was modeled on singer Adam Faith and actor Charlton Heston, that he immediately advised co-producer Sylvia Anderson that he wanted to play the studious young astronaut with the boyish quiff.

Character biography
The third son of Jeff Tracy (founder and financier of International Rescue), John was named after astronaut John Glenn. Sources vary in the canon of the Thunderbirds series as to John's age and birth date, although one written source suggests that he was born on 28 October 2002 or 2041—this would make him the third son. The majority of sources and two decades of Thunderbirds calendars cite John's birthday as 8 October and he is 24 years of age. Chris Bentley, author of The Complete Book of Thunderbirds, erroneously cited Gerry Anderson as the source of the misinformation about the birth order of the Tracy brothers, but later admitted that he was using the order of the brothers as shown in the credits. Most sourcebooks on Thunderbirds prior to the Complete book noted that the birth order matches the number of the Thunderbirds ships, save that the third brother (John) and fifth brother (Alan) trade shifts aboard their respective crafts. Also, the novel Operation: Asteroids from 1965 clearly states that Scott and Virgil are "Jeff's eldest sons".

John is a noted scholar of astronomy, and has authored several popular astronomy textbooks. He is a graduate of Harvard University with a degree in Advanced Telecommunications. 
 John's quiet intellectual nature and interest in astronomy make him the natural choice for the solitary life as the occupant of space station Thunderbird 5, monitoring for distress calls from around the world. He has only ever been seen physically involved in a rescue during the episode "Danger at Ocean Deep", although he reveals in a conversation with his father in that same episode that he has already been on a "dozen" rescues. According to Carlton Books' Lady Penelope's Secrets, John is known to be exceedingly patient, kindly and gracious and possessed of both great intelligence and poise as gifts inherited from his talented mother.

Live-action film
Lex Shrapnel portrayed John in the 2004 live-action film. Owing to the film focusing on Alan Tracy, little is known about this version of John; according to Alex Pang's Thunderbirds: X-Ray Cross Sections, he is 22 years of age, and a "computer whizz kid". John's tours of duty last for three weeks at a time, after which he gets a week's rest and relaxation on Tracy Island.

A brief scene between him and his father Jeff Tracy demonstrates that, like the original, he is a kind and patient person, listening to and providing encouragement for Jeff, who is concerned about Alan's behaviour.

Over the course of the film, John is nearly killed by the Hood, who launches a missile at Thunderbird 5, in order to lure International Rescue away from their base and allow him to steal their equipment.

Thunderbirds Are Go (TV series)
In the 2015 series, John is still the 'pilot' of Thunderbird 5, but his role is greatly expanded beyond simply receiving calls for help, often providing aid in coordinating the rescue missions via long-distance communication. He is voiced by Thomas Brodie-Sangster and is now a redhead, instead of being a blond (he and Gordon have traded hair colours).

John is shown as being an emotional introvert, who prefers spending his spare time eating bagels, watching TV (his favourite show is Stingray) and stargazing. He is generally a loner, who doesn't like having to spend more time on Earth than he has to, as he's now the lone operator of TB5 until EOS comes, a program that he designed by himself.

Carolyn Percy of the Wales Arts Review comments that because he was disliked by Gerry Anderson, the original John was the least developed Tracy brother. She considers the new John to be "something of a breakout character", also noting that the series characterises him as a "slightly anti-social loner".

References

External links
www.fab1.co.nz - Thunderbirds characters

American male characters in television
Fictional American scientists and engineers
Fictional astronauts
Fictional astronomers
Fictional Harvard University people
John Glenn
Male characters in animated series
Male characters in film
Television characters introduced in 1965
Thunderbirds (TV series) characters
Fictional people from the 21st-century